Patrick's Plains was an electoral district of the Legislative Assembly in the Australian state of New South Wales created in 1859 and named after an old name for the Singleton area. In 1894, it was replaced by Singleton.

Members for Patrick's Plains

Election results

References

Former electoral districts of New South Wales
1859 establishments in Australia
Constituencies established in 1859
1894 disestablishments in Australia
Constituencies disestablished in 1894